Birmingham is a village in Clay County, Missouri, United States. The population was 189 at the 2020 census. It is part of the Kansas City metropolitan area.

History
Birmingham was founded in 1887. The village was named after Birmingham, England. A post office was established at Birmingham in 1888, and remained in operation until 1956.

Geography
Birmingham is located at  (39.166653, -94.451845).

Birmingham is entirely surrounded by Kansas City.

Demographics

2010 census
As of the census of 2010, there were 183 people, 75 households, and 52 families living in the village. The racial makeup of the village was 94.5% White, 0.5% African American, 3.8% Native American, and 1.1% from other races. Hispanic or Latino of any race were 2.7% of the population.

There were 75 households, of which 29.3% had children under the age of 18 living with them, 46.7% were married couples living together, 13.3% had a female householder with no husband present, 9.3% had a male householder with no wife present, and 30.7% were non-families. 24.0% of all households were made up of individuals, and 8% had someone living alone who was 65 years of age or older. The average household size was 2.44 and the average family size was 2.87.

The median age in the village was 36.8 years. 22.4% of residents were under the age of 18; 11.5% were between the ages of 18 and 24; 24.6% were from 25 to 44; 31.8% were from 45 to 64; and 9.8% were 65 years of age or older. The gender makeup of the village was 54.6% male and 45.4% female.

2000 census
As of the census of 2000, there were 214 people, 82 households, and 56 families living in the village. The population density was 419.5 people per square mile (162.0/km2). There were 89 housing units at an average density of 174.4 per square mile (67.4/km2). The racial makeup of the village was 97.66% White, 0.93% African American, and 1.40% from two or more races.

There were 82 households, out of which 42.7% had children under the age of 18 living with them, 52.4% were married couples living together, 8.5% had a female householder with no husband present, and 31.7% were non-families. 24.4% of all households were made up of individuals, and 7.3% had someone living alone who was 65 years of age or older. The average household size was 2.61 and the average family size was 3.20.

In the village, the population was spread out, with 31.3% under the age of 18, 9.8% from 18 to 24, 26.6% from 25 to 44, 24.8% from 45 to 64, and 7.5% who were 65 years of age or older. The median age was 33 years. For every 100 females, there were 132.6 males. For every 100 females age 18 and over, there were 107.0 males.

The median income for a household in the village was $36,563, and the median income for a family was $45,000. Males had a median income of $38,125 versus $22,857 for females. The per capita income for the village was $16,420. About 8.1% of families and 5.1% of the population were below the poverty line, including 2.6% of those under the age of eighteen and 22.2% of those 65 or over.

Education
North Kansas City School District is the area school district. It is zoned to Topping Elementary School, Maple Park Middle School, and Winnetonka High School.

References

External links

Villages in Clay County, Missouri
Villages in Missouri